Southwark Park was a railway station in Bermondsey, south-east London, on the Greenwich Line between  and . It was opened by the South Eastern and Chatham Railway on 1 October 1902, on approximately the same site as the then long-closed Commercial Dock railway station. It was close to the southern end of Southwark Park, from which it took its name. South Bermondsey railway station, on the South London Line, is nearby. 

Two loop lines ran through the station, which was controlled by the Corbetts Lane Signal Cabin (later renamed Southwark Park Station Signal Cabin). Passengers boarded trains from two island platforms, reached from ground level via ramped approaches. A booking hall and station offices stood at ground level.

The station did not attract much traffic, as an electric tramway ran nearby and was more popular with travellers. Along with Spa Road and Deptford stations, Southwark Park station closed on 15 March 1915 due to wartime economies. It did not reopen due to competition from other public transport making it uneconomic to operate. The station continued to be used by railway staff until 21 September 1925. The bricked-up remains of the ticket hall are visible from the outside in Corbetts Lane. The abandoned interior of the ticket hall and foundations for the platforms were uncovered by Network Rail in March 2015 as part of Thameslink Programme upgrade.

British Rail did consider reopening the station as part of Thameslink in the 1980s but this never materialised.

References

External links
 Abandoned Stations - Southwark Park station (includes photos of surviving external elements of the station)
 Photographs of the former station's interior, uncovered in 2015
 Look what we've found! Thameslink work near London Bridge uncovers 'ghost' Southwark Park railway station – from This Is Local London

Disused railway stations in the London Borough of Southwark
Railway stations in Great Britain opened in 1902
Railway stations in Great Britain closed in 1915
Former South Eastern Railway (UK) stations